Bolko I can refer to:
 Bolko I the Strict (died 1301), Silesian duke
 Bolko I of Opole (died 1313), Silesian duke

See also
 Boleslaus I (disambiguation)